Svartnupen Peak is a peak on the south side of Hakon Col in the Kurze Mountains of Queen Maud Land. Mapped from surveys and air photos by Norwegian Antarctic Expedition (1956–60) and named Svartnupen (the black peak).

Mountains of Queen Maud Land
Princess Astrid Coast